The Lu'an–Anqing high-speed railway is a high-speed rail line in China. Construction started on 30 December 2020.

Stations
Lu'an (connection with the Hefei–Wuhan railway and Nanjing–Xi'an railway)
Huoshan
Huangwei
Yuexi
Qianshan (formerly known as Qianshan South) 
Anqing West (connection with the Hefei–Anqing–Jiujiang high-speed railway)

References

High-speed railway lines in China
High-speed railway lines under construction